Aliaksandr Radzionau (born 14 June 2000) is a Belarusian boxer. He competed in the men's welterweight event at the 2020 Summer Olympics.

References

External links
 

2000 births
Living people
Belarusian male boxers
Olympic boxers of Belarus
Boxers at the 2020 Summer Olympics
Place of birth missing (living people)
21st-century Belarusian people